Jagadambi Prasad Yadav was a Bharatiya Janata Party (BJP) leader and a minister of state Health and Family Welfare from 1977 to 1979 and then minister of state Commerce and Industry in the Morarji Desai Government of India. He was elected to Lok Sabha from Godda in Jharkhand. At the time of his death in 2002, he was Convenor of the Parliamentary Committee on Official Languages. He was President of Bharatiya Jana Sangh in Bihar as well as Bihar Bharatiya Janata Party from 1981 to 1984.

External links
 Data on Parliament of India

People from Godda district
2002 deaths
India MPs 1977–1979
India MPs 1996–1997
India MPs 1998–1999
India MPs 1999–2004
Lok Sabha members from Bihar
Rajya Sabha members from Bihar
Bharatiya Jana Sangh politicians
Rashtriya Swayamsevak Sangh members
Jharkhand politicians
Bharatiya Janata Party politicians from Jharkhand
Members of the Jharkhand Legislative Assembly
1925 births